Mir Mahalleh (also Romanized as Mīr Maḩalleh) is a village in Rud Pish Rural District, in the Central District of Fuman County, Gilan Province, Iran. At the 2006 census, its population was 200, in 49 families.

References 

Populated places in Fuman County